Extrasolar PlanetsEncyclopaediadata

Gliese 1214 is a dim M4.5 red dwarf in the constellation Ophiuchus with an apparent magnitude of 14.7. It is located at a distance of approximately 47 light years from Earth. The star is about one-fifth the radius of the Sun with a surface temperature estimated to be . Its luminosity is only 0.35% that of the Sun.

The estimate for the stellar radius is 15% larger than predicted by theoretical models. It also shows a 1% intrinsic variability in the near-infrared probably caused by stellar spots. The star is rotating slowly, with a period that is most likely an integer multiple of 53 days. It is probably at least three billion years old and a member of the old thin disk of the Milky Way.

In 2021-2022, the star is suspected to be in the low-activity phase of its magnetic starspot cycle.

Planetary system
In mid-December 2009, a team of Harvard-Smithsonian astronomers announced the discovery of a companion extrasolar planet, Gliese 1214 b, potentially composed largely of water and having the mass and diameter of a super-Earth.

Discovered by the MEarth project and investigated further by the HARPS spectrograph on ESO’s 3.6-metre telescope at La Silla, GJ 1214 b is the second super-Earth exoplanet for which astronomers have determined the mass and radius, giving vital clues about its structure. It is also the first super-Earth around which an atmosphere has been found. A search for additional planets using transit timing variations was negative.

No transit-time variations have yet been found for this transit. As of 2012, "the given data does not allow us to conclude that there is a [second] planet in the mass range 0.1–5 Earth-masses and the period range 0.76–1.23 or 1.91–3.18 days." The X-ray flux from the host star is estimated to have stripped  from the planet over the lifetime of the system.

In August 2022, this planetary system was included among 20 systems to be named by the third NameExoWorlds project.

See also
 COROT-7
 Gliese 581
 Gliese 876
 List of extrasolar planets

References

External links
Astronomers Find World with Thick, Inhospitable Atmosphere and an Icy Heart

1214
Ophiuchus (constellation)
M-type main-sequence stars
Planetary systems with one confirmed planet
Planetary transit variables
TIC objects